Adriel D'Avila Ba Loua (born 25 July 1996) is an Ivorian professional footballer who plays as a midfielder or forward for Ekstraklasa club Lech Poznań.

Career

Early career 
Ba Loua began his career in the club ASEC Mimosas in the Abidjan city of Côte d'Ivoire. Ba Loua starred at the youth department as 11 years old and joined the first-team squad as 16-year-old. He got two seasons at the club's first team.

Lille 
In the summer of 2015, Hervé Renard entrusted him to the French club Lille on a lease agreement. Renard was at the forefront of the Ivory Coast national team before he was coached in Lille in the summer of 2015. Renard was fired after thirteen matches for the French club, and the new coach did not see the same potential in Ba Loua.

Vejle Boldklub 
In the summer of 2016, Ba Loua changed to Vejle Boldklub. The offensive player was one of many new faces in the Jutland tradition club, which this summer was bought by Andrei Zolotko. Ba Loua in his first half season in the club played all matches in 1. Division. After the winter break, he lost his fixed place, but missed only three matches this season. He left the club after two seasons.

International career 
Ba Loua is quoted for U-20 international championships for the Ivory Coast. He has also been represented in the U-23 national team at the Vejle Boldklub.

Career statistics

Honours
Viktoria Plzeň
 Czech First League: 2021–22

Lech Poznań
 Ekstraklasa: 2021–22

References 

Living people
1996 births
Ivorian footballers
Association football forwards
Association football midfielders
ASEC Mimosas players
Lille OSC players
Vejle Boldklub players
MFK Karviná players
FC Viktoria Plzeň players
Lech Poznań players
Lech Poznań II players
Czech First League players
Ekstraklasa players
II liga players
Ivorian expatriate footballers
Ivorian expatriate sportspeople in France
Expatriate footballers in France
Ivorian expatriate sportspeople in Denmark
Expatriate men's footballers in Denmark
Ivorian expatriate sportspeople in the Czech Republic
Expatriate footballers in the Czech Republic
Ivorian expatriate sportspeople in Poland
Expatriate footballers in Poland